Ram Prasad Ram (born 11 December 1936) is an Indian former cricketer. He played one first-class match for Bengal in 1963/64.

See also
 List of Bengal cricketers

References

External links
 

1936 births
Living people
Indian cricketers
Bengal cricketers
Cricketers from Kolkata